Queens Directories – of New York City – were, before 1898, an assortment of village directories, Queens County directories, Long Island Directories, and add-ins or partial inclusions to New York City directories. In 1898, 30% of the western part of the old Queens County was absorbed into New York City. Before 1898, Nassau County covered the eastern 70% of the old Queens County. The older, larger Queens County was mostly agricultural, and within it were several towns, villages, and hamlets.  In the mid- to late-19th century, cemeteries constituted one of the larger industries in Queens, Kings (Brooklyn), and Westchester (north of The Bronx) Counties. As of 1898, Queens County, New York, and the Borough of Queens, New York City, geographically, have been the same. Both Queens and Brooklyn are on Long Island. (this article includes selected bibliography and selected timelines that help identify people of Queens throughout its history)

Timeline and highlights









The evolution of Queens intra- and interconnectivity through transit

Bridges and tunnels























































{| class="wikitable collapsible sortable static-row-numbers" cellpadding="1" style="color: black; background-color: #FFFFFF; font-size: 90%; width:100%"
|- 
! style="text-align:left; background:#eaecf0; border-style: solid; border-width: 0px 0px 0px 0px;" colspan=8 | History
|-  style="border-style: solid; border-color: #0085ff; border-width: 10px 0px 0px 0px;"
! Year !! Title !! Printer !! Compiler(s) !! GoogleBooks !! HathiTrust !! InternetArchive !! Other
|-
| width="6%;" data-sort-value="1845" | 1845
| width="22%" data-sort-value="history of long island 1845" | 
| style="text-align:center" width="18%" data-sort-value="carter 1845" | Robert Carter(publisher)Henry Ludwig(Heinrich Ludwig; 1805–1877)(printer)
| style="text-align:center" width="18%" data-sort-value="prime 1845" | Nathaniel Scudder Prime (1785–1856)
| style="text-align:center" width="9%" data-sort-value="harvard 1845" | 
| style="text-align:center" width="9%" data-sort-value="harvard 1845" | Harvard
| style="text-align:center" width="9%" data-sort-value="library of congress 1845" | Library of Congress
| style="text-align:center" width="9%" | 

|-
| width="6%;" data-sort-value="1846" | 1846
| width="22%" data-sort-value="documents 1845" | 
| style="text-align:center" width="18%" data-sort-value="leavitt trow 1846" | Leavitt, Trow and Company(printer)
| style="text-align:center" width="18%" data-sort-value="onderdonk 1846" | Henry Onderdonk, Jr. (1804–1886)
| style="text-align:center" width="9%" data-sort-value="harvard 1846" | 
| style="text-align:center" width="9%" | HarvardHarvardColumbiaNYPLNYPLLibrary of Congress
| style="text-align:center" width="9%" data-sort-value="harvard 1846" | HarvardColumbiaNYPLLibrary of Congress
| style="text-align:center" width="9%" | 

|-
| width="6%;" data-sort-value="1846" | 1846
| width="22%" data-sort-value="history of new netherland 1846" | 
| style="text-align:center" width="18%" data-sort-value="appleton 1846" | D. Appleton & Company(publisher)
| style="text-align:center" width="18%" data-sort-value="ocallaghan 1846" | Edmund Bailey O'Callaghan, M.D. (1897–1880)
| style="text-align:center" width="9%" data-sort-value="riverside 1846" | 

| style="text-align:center" width="9%" | 
| style="text-align:center" width="9%" | 
| style="text-align:center" width="9%" | 

|-
| width="6%;" data-sort-value="1847" | 1847
| width="22%" data-sort-value="sketch of the history 1847" | 
| style="text-align:center" width="18%" data-sort-value="leavitt trow 1847" | Leavitt, Trow and Company(printer)
| style="text-align:center" width="18%" data-sort-value="macdonald 1846" | James Madison MacDonald (1812–1876)
| style="text-align:center" width="9%" data-sort-value="nypl 1847" | 
| style="text-align:center" width="9%" data-sort-value="nypl 1847" | NYPL
| style="text-align:center" width="9%" data-sort-value="library of congress 1847" | Library of Congress
| style="text-align:center" width="9%" | 

|-
| width="6%;" data-sort-value="1852" | 1852
| width="22%" data-sort-value="annals of newton 1852" | 
| style="text-align:center" width="18%" data-sort-value="fanshaw 1852" | D. Fanshaw(Daniel Fanshaw; 1788–1860)(publisher)
| style="text-align:center" width="18%" data-sort-value="riker 1852" | James Riker, Jr. (1822–1889)
| style="text-align:center" width="9%"  data-sort-value="princeton 1852" | 
| style="text-align:center" width="9%"  data-sort-value="library of congress 1852" | Library of CongressColumbiaPrinceton
| style="text-align:center" width="9%"  data-sort-value="princeton 1852" | Princeton
| style="text-align:center" width="9%" | 

|-
| width="6%;" data-sort-value="1862" | 1862
| width="22%" data-sort-value="Two Centuries 1862" | 
| style="text-align:center" width="18%" data-sort-value="carter 1862" | Robert Carter & Brothers(Robert Carter; 1807–1889)(printer)
| style="text-align:center" width="18%" data-sort-value="macdonald 1862" | James Madison MacDonald (1812–1876)
| style="text-align:center" width="9%" data-sort-value="wisconsin 1862" | 
| style="text-align:center" width="9%" data-sort-value="wisconsin 1862" | Wisconsin Historical Society
| style="text-align:center" width="9%" data-sort-value="princeton 1862" | Princeton
| style="text-align:center" width="9%" | 

|-
| width="6%;" data-sort-value="1882" | 1882
| width="22%" data-sort-value="history of queens 1882" | 
| style="text-align:center" width="18%" data-sort-value="munsell 1882" | W.W. Munsell & Co.(William Watkins Munsell; 1850–1919)(publisher)George Macnamara (1845–1931)(printer)
| style="text-align:center" width="18%"| 
| style="text-align:center" width="9%" | 
| style="text-align:center" width="9%" data-sort-value="hathitrust 1882" | Columbia University
| style="text-align:center" width="9%" data-sort-value="columbia 1882" | Columbia University
| style="text-align:center" width="9%" | 

|-
| width="6%;" data-sort-value="1882" | 1882
| width="22%" data-sort-value="history of queens 1882" | 
| style="text-align:center" width="18%" data-sort-value="union publishing 1882" | Union Publishing House(publisher)Charles L. Snyder(president)
| style="text-align:center" width="18%"| James Dabney McCabe (1842–1883)
| style="text-align:center" width="9%" data-sort-value="university of chicago 1882" | 
| style="text-align:center" width="9%" data-sort-value="hathitrust 1882" | 
| style="text-align:center" width="9%" data-sort-value="columbia 1882" | Columbia University
| style="text-align:center" width="9%" | 

|-
| width="6%;" data-sort-value="1885" | 1885
| width="22%" data-sort-value="bayiles 1885" | 
| style="text-align:center" width="18%" data-sort-value="bayles 1885" | Ritchard Mather Bayles (1846–1930)(publisher)Budget Steam Print(printer)
| style="text-align:center" width="18%" data-sort-value="bayles 1885" | Ritchard Mather Bayles (1846–1930)
| style="text-align:center" width="9%" data-sort-value="harvard 1885" | 
| style="text-align:center" width="9%" data-sort-value="harvard 1885" | Harvard
| style="text-align:center" width="9%" data-sort-value="harvard 1885" | Harvard
| style="text-align:center" width="9%" | 

|-
| width="6%;" data-sort-value="1896" | 1896
| width="22%" data-sort-value="early long island 1896" | 
| style="text-align:center" width="18%" data-sort-value="putnam 1896" | G.P. Putnam's Sons(publisher)The Knickerbocker Press(printer)
| style="text-align:center" width="18%" data-sort-value="flint 1896" | Martha Bockée Flint (1841–1900)
| style="text-align:center" width="9%" data-sort-value="nypl 1896" | 
| style="text-align:center" width="9%" data-sort-value="library of congress 1896" | Library of Congress
| style="text-align:center" width="9%" data-sort-value="cornell 1896" | Cornell University
| style="text-align:center" width="9%" | 

|-
| width="6%;" data-sort-value="1896" | 1896
| width="22%" data-sort-value="history of long island city 1896" | 
| style="text-align:center" width="18%" data-sort-value="long island star 1896" | Long Island Star Publishing Company(publisher)
| style="text-align:center" width="18%" data-sort-value="kelsey 1896" | Joel Smith Kelsey (1848–1924)
| style="text-align:center" width="9%" | 
| style="text-align:center" width="9%" data-sort-value="library of congress 1896" | Library of Congress
| style="text-align:center" width="9%" data-sort-value="library of congress 1896" | Library of CongressAllen County Public Library
| style="text-align:center" width="9%" | 

|-
| width="6%;" data-sort-value="1897" | 1897
| width="22%" data-sort-value="prominent families of new york index 1897" | 
| style="text-align:center" width="18%" data-sort-value="historical company 1898" | The Historical Company
| style="text-align:center" width="18%" data-sort-value="nicoll 1897" | Nicoll & Roy Company(printer & binder)
| style="text-align:center" width="9%" | 
| style="text-align:center" width="9%" data-sort-value="harvard 1897" | Library of Congress
| style="text-align:center" width="9%" data-sort-value="library of congress 1897" | Library of Congress
| style="text-align:center" width="9%" | 

|-
| width="6%;" data-sort-value="1898" | 1898
| width="22%" data-sort-value="prominent families of new york index 1898" | 
| style="text-align:center" width="18%" data-sort-value="historical company 1898" | The Historical Company
| style="text-align:center" width="18%"data-sort-value="nicoll 1898" | Nicoll & Roy Company(printer & binder)
| style="text-align:center" width="9%" data-sort-value="harvard 1898" | 
| style="text-align:center" width="9%" | 
| style="text-align:center" width="9%" | Allen County Public Library
| style="text-align:center" width="9%" | 

|-
| width="6%;" data-sort-value="1897" | 1898
| width="22%" data-sort-value="prominent families of new york index 1898" | 
| style="text-align:center" width="18%" data-sort-value="historical company 1898" | The Historical Company
| style="text-align:center" width="18%" data-sort-value="nicoll 1898" | Nicoll & Roy Company(printer & binder)
| style="text-align:center" width="9%" data-sort-value="iowa 1898" | 
| style="text-align:center" width="9%" | 
| style="text-align:center" width="9%" data-sort-value="iowa 1898" | Cornell
| style="text-align:center" width="9%" | 

|-
| width="6%;" data-sort-value="1899" | 1899
| width="22%" data-sort-value="history of queens 1899" | 
| style="text-align:center" width="18%" data-sort-value="ridenour 1899" | J. H. Ridenour(John Henry Ridenour; 1858–1928)(publisher)
| style="text-align:center" width="18%" data-sort-value="waller 1899" | Rev. Henry Davey Waller (1852–1925)
| style="text-align:center" width="9%" | 
| style="text-align:center" width="9%" data-sort-value="cornell 1899" | CornellLibrary of Congress
| style="text-align:center" width="9%" data-sort-value="allen county 1899" | Allen County Public LibraryLibrary of Congress
| style="text-align:center" width="9%" | 

|-
| width="6%;" data-sort-value="1908" | 1908
| width="22%" data-sort-value="illustrated history 1908" | 
| style="text-align:center" width="18%" data-sort-value="smiley 1908" | F. T. Smiley Publishing Co.(publisher)(Frederick Thomas Smiley; 1857–1910)(Jerome Chester Smiley; 1882–1968)(George W. Flaacke)
| style="text-align:center" width="18%" data-sort-value="skal 1908" | George Hugo August Eugen von Skal (1854–1924)For the Flushing Journal
| style="text-align:center" width="9%" data-sort-value="library of congress 1908" | 
| style="text-align:center" width="9%" data-sort-value="library of congress 1908" | Library of Congress
| style="text-align:center" width="9%" data-sort-value="library of congress 1908" | Library of Congress
| style="text-align:center" width="9%" | 

|-
| width="6%;" data-sort-value="1909" | 1909
| width="22%" data-sort-value="historical guide 1909" | 
| style="text-align:center" width="18%" data-sort-value="stokes 1909" | Frederick A. Stokes Company(publisher)
| style="text-align:center" width="18%" data-sort-value="city history 1909" | City History Club of New YorkFrank Bergen Kelley (1867–1934)(compiler)
| style="text-align:center" width="9%" data-sort-value="new york public library 1909" | 
| style="text-align:center" width="9%" | 
| style="text-align:center" width="9%" data-sort-value="library of congress 1909" | Library of Congress
| style="text-align:center" width="9%" | 

|-
| width="6%;" data-sort-value="1911" | 1911
| width="22%" data-sort-value="civic bibliography 1911" | 
| style="text-align:center" width="18%" data-sort-value="new york 1909" | New York Research Council, Charities Publication Committee(publisher)
| style="text-align:center" width="18%" data-sort-value="reynolds 1911" | James Bronson Reynolds (1861–1924)(editor)
| style="text-align:center" width="9%" data-sort-value="harvard 1909" | 
| style="text-align:center" width="9%" | 
| style="text-align:center" width="9%" | 
| style="text-align:center" width="9%" | 

|-
| width="6%;" data-sort-value="1913" | 1913
| width="22%" data-sort-value="historical guide 1913" | 
| style="text-align:center" width="18%" data-sort-value="stokes 1913" | Frederick A. Stokes Company(publisher)
| style="text-align:center" width="18%" data-sort-value="city history 1913" | City History Club of New YorkFrank Bergen Kelley (1867–1934)(compiler)Edward Hagaman Hall (1858–1936)(editor)
| style="text-align:center" width="9%" | 
| style="text-align:center" width="9%" | 
| style="text-align:center" width="9%" data-sort-value="library of congress 1913" | Library of Congress
| style="text-align:center" width="9%" | 

|-
| width="6%;" data-sort-value="1913" | 1913
| width="22%" data-sort-value="queens borough 1913" | 
| style="text-align:center" width="18%" data-sort-value="chamber of commerce 1913" | The Manufacturing and Industrial Committee of the Chamber of Commerce of the Borough of New York(publisher)Brooklyn Eagle Press(printer)
| style="text-align:center" width="18%" data-sort-value="willis 1915" | Walter Irving Willis (1882–1937)(compiler & editor)
| style="text-align:center" width="9%" | 
| style="text-align:center" width="9%" data-sort-value="library of commerce 1913" | Library of Commerce
| style="text-align:center" width="9%" | 
| style="text-align:center" width="9%" | 

|-
| width="6%;" data-sort-value="1913" | 1913
| width="22%" data-sort-value="queens borough 1913" | 
| style="text-align:center" width="18%" data-sort-value="lyon 1913" | J.B. Lyon & Co.(James B. Lyon; 1858–1924)(printer)
| style="text-align:center" width="18%" data-sort-value="mather 1913" | Frederic Gregory Mather (1844–1925)
| style="text-align:center" width="9%" data-sort-value="UC Berkeley 1913" | 
| style="text-align:center" width="9%"  | 
| style="text-align:center" width="9%" | 
| style="text-align:center" width="9%" | 

|-
| width="6%;" data-sort-value="1914" | 1914
| width="22%" data-sort-value="records of the town of jamaica 1914" | 
| style="text-align:center" width="18%" data-sort-value="long island historical 1914" | Long Island Historical Society(publisher)
| style="text-align:center" width="18%" data-sort-value="frost 1914" | Josephine C. Frost(Mrs. Samuel Knapp Frost)(née Josephine Crossette Mayou; 1864–1942)(editor)
| style="text-align:center" width="9%" data-sort-value="minnesota 1914" | 
| style="text-align:center" width="9%" data-sort-value="minnesota 1914" | Vol. 1. University of MinnesotaVol. 2. University of MinnesotaVol. 3. University of Minnesota
| style="text-align:center" width="9%" data-sort-value="nypl 1914" | Vol. 1. NYPLVol. 2. NYPLVol. 3. Library of Congress
| style="text-align:center" width="9%" | 

|-
| width="6%;" data-sort-value="1914" | 1914
| width="22%" data-sort-value="origin and history 1914" | 
| style="text-align:center" width="18%" data-sort-value="shakespeare 1914" | The Shakespeare PressRegistered trade name of Charles H. Cochrane(publisher)
| style="text-align:center" width="18%" data-sort-value="ladd 1914" | Horatio Oliver Ladd (1839–1832)
| style="text-align:center" width="9%" data-sort-value="wisconsin 1914" | 
| style="text-align:center" width="9%" data-sort-value="library of congress 1914" | Library of Congress
| style="text-align:center" width="9%" data-sort-value="princeton 1914" | Princeton Seminary
| style="text-align:center" width="9%" | 

|-
| width="6%;" data-sort-value="1915" | 1915
| width="22%" data-sort-value="queens borough 1915" | 
| style="text-align:center" width="18%"| 
| style="text-align:center" width="18%"|
| style="text-align:center" width="9%" | 
| style="text-align:center" width="9%" |
| style="text-align:center" width="9%" data-sort-value="california 1915" | University of California
| style="text-align:center" width="9%" | 

|-
| width="6%;" data-sort-value="1915" | 1915
| width="22%" data-sort-value="queens borough 1915" | 
| style="text-align:center" width="18%" data-sort-value="chamber of commerce 1920" | The Manufacturing and Industrial Committee of the Chamber of Commerce of the Borough of New York(publisher)Long Island Star Publishing Company(printer)
| style="text-align:center" width="18%" data-sort-value="willis 1915" | Walter Irving Willis (1882–1937)(compiler & editor)
| style="text-align:center" width="9%" | 
| style="text-align:center" width="9%" data-sort-value="library of commerce 1915" | Library of Commerce
| style="text-align:center" width="9%" | 
| style="text-align:center" width="9%" | 

|-
| width="6%;" data-sort-value="1917" | 1917
| width="22%" data-sort-value="origin and history 1917" | 
| style="text-align:center" width="18%" data-sort-value="bellot 1917" | Bellot's Histories, Inc.(publisher)
| style="text-align:center" width="18%" data-sort-value="bellot 1917" | Alfred Henry Bellot (1882–1965)
| style="text-align:center" width="9%" | (limited preview)
| style="text-align:center" width="9%" | 
| style="text-align:center" width="9%" data-sort-value="brooklyn 1917" | Brooklyn Public LibraryCornell University
| style="text-align:center" width="9%" | 

|-
| width="6%;" data-sort-value="1918" | 1918
| width="22%" data-sort-value="origin and history 1918" | 
| style="text-align:center" width="18%" data-sort-value="bellot 1918" | Bellot's Histories, Inc.(publisher)
| style="text-align:center" width="18%" data-sort-value="bellot 1918" | Alfred Henry Bellot (1882–1965)
| style="text-align:center" width="9%" | 
| style="text-align:center" width="9%" | 
| style="text-align:center" width="9%" data-sort-value="library of congress 1918" | Library of Congress
| style="text-align:center" width="9%" | 

|-
| width="6%;" data-sort-value="1920" | 1920
| width="22%" data-sort-value="queens borough 1920" | 
| style="text-align:center" width="18%" data-sort-value="chamber of commerce 1920" | Chamber of Commerce of the Borough of New York(publisher)Long Island Star Publishing Company(printer)
| style="text-align:center" width="18%" data-sort-value="willis 1920" | Walter Irving Willis (1882–1937)(compiler & editor)
| style="text-align:center" width="9%" data-sort-value="harvard 1920" | 
| style="text-align:center" width="9%" data-sort-value="harvard 1920" | HarvardLibrary of Congress
| style="text-align:center" width="9%" data-sort-value="prelinger library 1920" | Prelinger Library
| style="text-align:center" width="9%" | 

|-
| width="6%;" data-sort-value="1923" | 1923
| width="22%" data-sort-value="landmarks of new york 1923" | 
| style="text-align:center" width="18%" data-sort-value="city history club 1923" | City History Club of New York(publisher)
| style="text-align:center" width="18%" data-sort-value="peterson 1923" | Arthur Everett Peterson, PhD (1871–1943)(editor)
| style="text-align:center" width="9%" data-sort-value="UC Berkeley 1923" | 
| style="text-align:center" width="9%" data-sort-value="UC Berkeley 1923" | UC Berkeley
| style="text-align:center" width="9%" | 
| style="text-align:center" width="9%" | 

|-
| width="6%;" data-sort-value="1924" | 1924
| width="22%" data-sort-value="keskachauge 1924" | {{hanging indent |text=''Keskachauge – Or the First White Settlement on Long Island'}}
| style="text-align:center" width="18%" data-sort-value="putnam 1924" | G.P. Putnam's Sons(publisher)
| style="text-align:center" width="18%" data-sort-value="van wych 1924" | Frederick Van Wyck (1853–1936)
| style="text-align:center" width="9%" data-sort-value="wisconsin 1924" | 
| style="text-align:center" width="9%" | 
| style="text-align:center" width="9%" | 
| style="text-align:center" width="9%" | 

|-
| width="6%;" data-sort-value="1924" | 1924
| width="22%" data-sort-value="landmarks of new york 1924" | 
| style="text-align:center" width="18%" data-sort-value="city history club 1924" | City History Club of New York(publisher)
| style="text-align:center" width="18%" data-sort-value="peterson 1924" | Arthur Everett Peterson, PhD (1871–1943)(editor)
| style="text-align:center" width="9%" data-sort-value="new york public library 1924" | 
| style="text-align:center" width="9%" data-sort-value="new york public library 1924" | New York Public Library
| style="text-align:center" width="9%" | 
| style="text-align:center" width="9%" | 

|-
| width="6%;" data-sort-value="1925" | 1925
| width="22%" data-sort-value="guide book to noted places 1925" | 
| style="text-align:center" width="18%"|
| style="text-align:center" width="18%" data-sort-value="armbruster 1925" | Eugene Louis Armbruster (1865–1943) 
| style="text-align:center" width="9%" | 
| style="text-align:center" width="9%" | 
| style="text-align:center" width="9%" | 
| style="text-align:center" width="9%" data-sort-value="new york heritage 1925" | 

|-
| width="6%;" data-sort-value="1925" | 1925
| width="22%" data-sort-value="boroughs of brooklyn and queens 1925" | 
| style="text-align:center" width="18%" data-sort-value="lewis historical publishing 1925" | Lewis Historical Publishing Company, Inc.(publisher)
| style="text-align:center" width="18%" data-sort-value="hazelton 1925" | Henry "Harry" Isham Hazelton (1867–1938)
| style="text-align:center" width="9%" data-sort-value="columbia 1925" | 
| style="text-align:center" width="9%" | 
| style="text-align:center" width="9%" data-sort-value="allen county 1925" |
 Vol. 1. Allen County
 Vol. 3. Allen County
 Vol. 4. Allen County
 Vol. 5. Allen County
 Vol. 7. Allen County
| style="text-align:center" width="9%" | 

|-
| width="6%;" data-sort-value="1950" | 1950
| width="22%" data-sort-value="old queens 1950" | 
| style="text-align:center" width="18%" data-sort-value="dover publications 1950" |
| style="text-align:center" width="18%" data-sort-value="seyfried 1950" | Vincent Francis Seyfried (1918–2012)William Asadorian
| style="text-align:center" width="9%" | 
| style="text-align:center" width="9%" | 
| style="text-align:center" width="9%" data-sort-value="columbia university 1950" | Columbia University
| style="text-align:center" width="9%" | 

|-
| width="6%;" data-sort-value="1952" | 1952
| width="22%" data-sort-value="history little neck 1952" | 
| style="text-align:center" width="18%" data-sort-value="little neck community 1952" | Little Neck Community Association(publisher)William James & Co.(printer)
| style="text-align:center" width="18%"| 
| style="text-align:center" width="9%" | 
| style="text-align:center" width="9%" | 
| style="text-align:center" width="9%" data-sort-value="allen 1952" | Allen County Public Library
| style="text-align:center" width="9%" | 

|-
| width="6%;" data-sort-value="1960" | 1960
| width="22%" data-sort-value="indian affairs 1960" | 
| style="text-align:center" width="18%"| Cornell University Press(1st ed.; 1960)University of Nebraska Press(1997 re-print)
| style="text-align:center" width="18%" data-sort-value="trelease 1960" | Allen W. Trelease (1928–2011)
| style="text-align:center" width="9%"  data-sort-value="trelease 1960" | (1997 re-print)(limited preview)
| style="text-align:center" width="9%" | 
| style="text-align:center" width="9%" data-sort-value="allen 1952" | 
| style="text-align:center" width="9%" | 

|-
| width="6%;" data-sort-value="1990" | 1990
| width="22%" data-sort-value="bibliography 1990" | 
| style="text-align:center" width="18%" data-sort-value="friedman 1990" | Ira J. Friedman, Inc. (1968)(a division of Kennikat Press owned by Cornell Jaray)Heritage Books (1988)Heritage Books (1990)
| style="text-align:center" width="18%" data-sort-value="nestler 1990" | Harold Robert Nestler (1921–2015)
| style="text-align:center" width="9%" | 
| style="text-align:center" width="9%" | 
| style="text-align:center" width="9%" data-sort-value="internet archive 1990" | 
| style="text-align:center" width="9%" | 

|-
| width="6%;" data-sort-value="1991" | 1991
| width="22%" data-sort-value="old queens 1991" | 
| style="text-align:center" width="18%" data-sort-value="dover publications 1991" | Dover Publications
| style="text-align:center" width="18%" data-sort-value="seyfried 1991" | Vincent Francis Seyfried (1918–2012)William Asadorian
| style="text-align:center" width="9%" data-sort-value="google books 1991" | (limited preview)
| style="text-align:center" width="9%" | 
| style="text-align:center" width="9%" | 
| style="text-align:center" width="9%" | 

|-
| width="6%;" data-sort-value="1995" | 1995
| width="22%" data-sort-value="elmhurst 1995" | 
| style="text-align:center" width="18%" data-sort-value="seyfried 1995" | Vincent Francis Seyfried (1918–2012)(publisher)
| style="text-align:center" width="18%" data-sort-value="seyfried 1995" | Vincent Francis Seyfried (1918–2012)
| style="text-align:center" width="9%" | 
| style="text-align:center" width="9%" | 
| style="text-align:center" width="9%" data-sort-value="internet archive 1995" | Internet Archive
| style="text-align:center" width="9%" | 

|-
| width="6%;" data-sort-value="2004" | 2004
| width="22%" data-sort-value="long island city 2004" | 
| style="text-align:center" width="18%" data-sort-value="arcadia 2004" | Arcadia Publishing
| style="text-align:center" width="18%" data-sort-value="greater astoria 2004" | Greater Astoria Historical SocietyThomas JacksonRichard Melnick
| style="text-align:center" width="9%" data-sort-value="google books 2004" | (limited preview)
(limited preview)
(limited preview)
| style="text-align:center" width="9%" | 
| style="text-align:center" width="9%" | 
| style="text-align:center" width="9%" | 

|-
| width="6%;" data-sort-value="2006" | 2006
| width="22%" data-sort-value="long island city 2013" | 
| style="text-align:center" width="18%" data-sort-value="collins 2006" | Collins
| style="text-align:center" width="18%" data-sort-value="walsh 2006" | Kevin Walsh(founder of Forgotten NY)
| style="text-align:center" width="9%" | 
| style="text-align:center" width="9%" | 
| style="text-align:center" width="9%" data-sort-value="boston public 2006" | 
| style="text-align:center" width="9%" | 

|-
| width="6%;" data-sort-value="2007" | 2007
| width="22%" data-sort-value="rockaways 2007" | 
| style="text-align:center" width="18%" data-sort-value="arcadia 2007" | Arcadia Publishing
| style="text-align:center" width="18%" data-sort-value="lucev 2007" | Emil Robert Lucev, Jr. (1933–2018)
| style="text-align:center" width="9%" data-sort-value="google books 2011" | (limited preview)
| style="text-align:center" width="9%" | 
| style="text-align:center" width="9%" | 
| style="text-align:center" width="9%" | 

|-
| width="6%;" data-sort-value="2011" | 2011
| width="22%" data-sort-value="fresh meadows 2011" | 
| style="text-align:center" width="18%" data-sort-value="arcadia 2011" | Arcadia Publishing
| style="text-align:center" width="18%" data-sort-value="cantor 2011" | Fred CantorDebra Davidson
| style="text-align:center" width="9%" data-sort-value="google books 2011" | (limited preview)
| style="text-align:center" width="9%" | 
| style="text-align:center" width="9%" | 
| style="text-align:center" width="9%" | 

|-
| width="6%;" data-sort-value="2004" | 2011
| width="22%" data-sort-value="jamaica station 2011" | 
| style="text-align:center" width="18%" data-sort-value="arcadia 2011" | Arcadia Publishing
| style="text-align:center" width="18%" data-sort-value="morrison 2011" | David D. Morrison
| style="text-align:center" width="9%" data-sort-value="google books 2011" | (limited preview)
| style="text-align:center" width="9%" | 
| style="text-align:center" width="9%" | 
| style="text-align:center" width="9%" | 

|-
| width="6%;" data-sort-value="2013" | 2013
| width="22%" data-sort-value="long island city 2013" | 
| style="text-align:center" width="18%" data-sort-value="arcadia 2004" | Arcadia Publishing
| style="text-align:center" width="18%" data-sort-value="walsh 2013" | Kevin Walsh(founder of Forgotten NY)
| style="text-align:center" width="9%" data-sort-value="google books 2004" | (limited preview)
| style="text-align:center" width="9%" | 
| style="text-align:center" width="9%" | 
| style="text-align:center" width="9%" | 

|-
| width="6%;" data-sort-value="2015" | 2015
| width="22%" data-sort-value="fresh meadows 2015" | 
| style="text-align:center" width="18%" data-sort-value="arcadia 2015" | Arcadia Publishing
| style="text-align:center" width="18%" | 
| style="text-align:center" width="9%" data-sort-value="google books 2015" | (limited preview)
| style="text-align:center" width="9%" | 
| style="text-align:center" width="9%" | 
| style="text-align:center" width="9%" | 

|-
| width="6%;" data-sort-value="2018" | 2018
| width="22%" data-sort-value="flushing story 2018" | 
| style="text-align:center" width="18%" data-sort-value="wing 2018" | I Wing Press Inc.(Xinye Qiu; Flushing)
| style="text-align:center" width="18%" data-sort-value="qiu 2018" | [Paul] Xinye Qiu (born 1962)&SinoVision()
| style="text-align:center" width="9%" data-sort-value="google books 2018" | (limited preview)
| style="text-align:center" width="9%" | 
| style="text-align:center" width="9%" | 
| style="text-align:center" width="9%" | 

|-
| width="6%;" data-sort-value="2018" | 2018
| width="22%" data-sort-value="flushing 2018" | 
| style="text-align:center" width="18%" data-sort-value="wing 2018" | I Wing Press Inc.(Xinye Qiu; Flushing)
| style="text-align:center" width="18%" data-sort-value="luo 2018" | Wei-Nian Luo (born 1960)[Paul] Xinye Zhu Qiu (born 1962)(authors)
| style="text-align:center" width="9%" data-sort-value="google books 2018" | (limited preview)
| style="text-align:center" width="9%" | 
| style="text-align:center" width="9%" | 
| style="text-align:center" width="9%" | 

|-
| width="6%;" data-sort-value="2020" | 2020
| width="22%" data-sort-value="queens nobody knows 2020" | 
| style="text-align:center" width="18%" data-sort-value="princeton university press 2020" | Princeton University Press
| style="text-align:center" width="18%" data-sort-value="helmreich 2020" | William Benno Helmreich (1945–2020)
| style="text-align:center" width="9%" data-sort-value="google books 2015" | (limited preview)(limited preview)
| style="text-align:center" width="9%" | 
| style="text-align:center" width="9%" | 
| style="text-align:center" width="9%" | 

|-
| width="6%;" data-sort-value="2021" | 2021
| width="22%" data-sort-value="douglaston-little neck 2021" | 
| style="text-align:center" width="18%" data-sort-value="arcadia 2021" | Arcadia Publishing
| style="text-align:center" width="18%" data-sort-value="antos 2021" | Jason D. Antos
| style="text-align:center" width="9%" data-sort-value="google books 2021" | (limited preview)
| style="text-align:center" width="9%" | 
| style="text-align:center" width="9%" | 
| style="text-align:center" width="9%" | 

|}

  

  

  

  

 Pratt in Doggett's 1845 directory: Pratt & Co., daguerreotypes, 293 Broadway

  

 Map gallery 

 Neighborhoods, neighborhood microcosms – including selected ethnic enclaves 

Because neighborhoods are unincorporated communities, the boundaries and gradations of recognizability vary. Astoria
           Astoria Heights
      Ditmars
                     Steinway
          
     
      Little Egypt
      Norwood Gardens
      Ravenswood
     
 Jackson Heights
           Jackson Heights Historic District
      Jackson Heights Business District
     
 Long Island City
           Blissville
      Hunters Point
                     MoMA PS1
           Gantry Plaza State Park
          
     
      Dutch Kills
      Queensbridge
      Queensview
      Queens West
                     
          
     
      Queens Plaza
                     Queens Plaza Park
          
     
     
 Sunnyside
           Sunnyside Gardens
                     Phipps Gardens
          
     
      Sunnyside Yard
      Bayside
           Bayside Gables
      Bay Terrace
      Bayside Hills
      Fort Totten
      Oakland Gardens
      Lawrence Cemetery
     
 Bellerose
 College Point
 Douglaston–Little Neck
           Douglaston
                     Douglas Bay
           Douglas Manor
           Douglaston Hill
           Douglaston Park
           Winchester Estates
           Douglaston Historic District
           Douglaston Hill Historic District
          
     
      Little Neck
                     Pines
           Little Neck Hills
           Westmorland
          
     
     
 Flushing
           Flushing Chinatown
      Auburndale
      
                     Bowne Park
          
     
      Chinatown
      Downtown Flushing
      Kew Gardens Hills
      Linden Hill
      
                     Koreatown
           
          
     
      
     
 Flushing Meadows–Corona Park
           Shea Stadium
      Citi Field
      
      
      
      New York Hall of Science
      Flushing Meadows Natatorium
      Corona Ash Dumps (1920s)
     
 Pomonok
           Electchester
      Queensboro Hill
     
 Floral Park, Queens
 Fresh Meadows
           Hillcrest
      Utopia
     
 Glen Oaks
           North Shore Towers
      Queens County Farm Museum
     
 Whitestone
           Beechhurst
      Clearview
      Malba
      Briarwood
 Corona
           LeFrak City
      North Corona
      Willets Point
     
 East Elmhurst
           Lent Homestead and Cemetery
      LaGuardia Airport
     
 Elmhurst
           Chinese enclave
      Elmhurst Park
     
 Forest Hills
           
                     West Side Tennis Club
          
     
      Forest Hills Co-op
     
 Glendale
 Kew Gardens
           Kew Bolmer
     
 Maspeth
           Mount Olivet Cemetery
     
 Middle Village
           Juniper Park
                     Juniper Valley Park
          
     
     Remsen Cemetery
     
 Rego Park
 Ridgewood
           Wyckoff Heights
      Fresh Pond
      Fresh Pond–Traffic Historic District
     
 Woodside
           Little Manila
      Boulevard Gardens
      Moore-Jackson Cemetery
      Brookville (aka Springfield Gardens)
 Cambria Heights
 Hollis
           Holliswood
     
 Jamaica
           Jamaica Estates
      Jamaica Hills
      Rochdale Village
      John F. Kennedy International Airport
      Prospect Cemetery
     
 Laurelton
 Meadowmere
 Queens Village
           Bellaire
      Hollis Hills
     
 Rosedale
           Warnerville
     
 St. Albans
 South Jamaica
           Baislely Park
      South Jamaica Houses
      The Hole
 Howard Beach
           Hamilton Beach
      Howard Park
      Lindenwood
      Old Howard Beach
      Ramblersville
      Rockwood Park
      
     
 Ozone Park
           Centreville
      South Ozone Park
                     Aqueduct Racetrack
          
     
      Tudor Village
     
 Richmond Hill
           Little Pubjab
     
 Woodhaven Rockaway Peninsula
           Far Rockaway
      Wavecrest
      Bayswater
      Edgemere
                     Edgemere Landfill
          
     
      Arverne
      Somerville
      Hammels
      Rockaway Beach
      Seaside
      Rockaway Park
      Belle Harbor
      Neponsit
      Breezy Point
      Roxbury
      Broad Channel (adjacent to the Rockaways)
     

 Bygone Queens communities, community names, and pieces of land  Astoria
           
      
      
     
 Jackson Heights
           
     
 Long Island City
           
      
      
      College Point
           
      
      
      
     
 Flushing
           
      
      
                     Bowne Park 
           Ingleside 
           Flushing Park 
          
     
     
 Whitestone
           Beechhurst
                     Trow Settlement 
          
      
       
           Middelburgh  (1652–1664)
      New Towne  (1665–1896)
      
      
      
      
     
 West Maspeth
           Melvina  (hamlet)
     
 Laurel Hill / West Maspeth
           Berlinville  (established 1870s)
     
 Woodside
           Winfield 
     
 Ridgewood
           Linden Hill 
     
 Middle Village
           Whitepot 
      Hollis
           Holliswood
                     Terrace Heights 
          
     
 Jamaica
           Springfield 
     
 Queens Village
           Creedmoor 
      Howard Beach
           
     '''
 Rockaway, Queens
           
     
 Far Rockaway
           
     

 The Village of Creedmoor (now part of Queens Village and Glen Oaks), was, essentially, an elaborate, internationally acclaimed rifle range that was, before 1872, part of a farm owned and operated by Bernardus Hendrickson Creed (1811–1889). In July 1872, the State of New York, on behalf of the National Rifle Association (NRA), for $26,250, purchased 70 acres of level land from Creed, and, on June 21, 1873, opened an outdoor firing range with assistance of (i) the U.S. War Department (Army Corps of Engineers), (ii) the State of New York under the auspices of the New York Army National Guard, and (iii) the City of New York. Its name was selected by newspaper man, Col. Henry G. Shaw ( Henry Glenville Shaw; 1843–1907). He initially named it Creed's Moor, a geographical reference, and the name eventually became Creedmoor Rifle Range. The Central Railroad of Long Island – on a line that ran from Long Island City to Bethpage – opened its Creedmoor branch January 8, 1873. Creedmoor's international match, first held in 1874, was the forerunner of the Palma trophy competition. In 1892, as a result of declining public interest and mounting noise complaints from the growing neighborhood, the NRA deeded its land back to the state. In 1908, the State Legislature dedicated the land for use by the Long Island State Hospital. In 1912, the property became the Farm Colony of Brooklyn State Hospital, which eventually became the Creedmoor Psychiatric Center, located south of the interchange of Grand Central and the Cross Island Parkways. (see Google Map aerial view of the Creedmoor Psychiatric Center) After 1960, parts of the property – the Cornell Farmhouse or the Creedmoor Farmhouse Complex or the Jacob Adriance Farmhouse – became part of the Queens County Farm Museum. (see Google Map aerial view of Queens County Farm)
 Mussel Island – no occupants ever – was a small and marshy piece of land at the junction of Maspeth Creek and Newtown Creek. (Google Map aerial view the location of the former Mussel Island, at the confluence of Newtown and Maspeth Creeks)

Selected Queens directories not found online 

  ; .
 
 
 

  ; .
 

 

 

 

 

 

 

  .

  ; .

  ; UUID 60eb200-63b3-0137-0e33-6d8cb27f4437.
 

  
 
 
 

  ; .
  .
  ; .

Wikimedia Commons 
 Old maps of Queens
 Maps of Queens
 Beers maps of Long Island (1873)
 Bromley maps of Queens (1909)
 Travel maps of Queens
 Neighborhoods in Queens, New York City

Bibliography

Annotations

Notes

References 

 
  ;  (hard cover);  (paperback); ; .
  ; .
 
 
 

  ; .
 
 

  ; .
 

  ; ;  (1990 PhD dissertation ).
 

 
 

  ; ; .
 

 
 
 
 
 

   ; .

 
 
 
 
 
 
 

  ; ; .
 
 

 
 
 
 

 
           
                     
           
           
           
                     
           
           
 
 
 
 

 
          <li> 
                     
"We have no streets analogous to your Fifth Avenue, but neither have we any resembling those of your tenderloin district. With us are as yet no extremes of wealth or poverty, but the families of moderate means are becoming fewer with you."

 
 

<li> 
           
[Consolidation is] "a question which often arises in the minds of citizens of New-York who have faith in its future growth and in what Mayor Hewitt has called its 'imperial destiny."

 

 
 

  ; .
 
 
 

  ; .
 

  ; .
 

  ; .
 
 

  ; .
 

  .
  ; .
 

 . ; .
  ;  (hardback);  (paperback); .
  
  

   (1995 ed.),  (2nd ed.; 2006); ; .
  ; .
 
 

 
  ; .

  ; .
 

  ; .
 
 

  .

 
 

  ; .
 
 
 

   ; .
 

  ; ; .
  → also accessible via  (Library of Congress). ; .
 
 → 
 
 
 
 
 
 

 
 
 
  ; .
 
 

 

  ; .
  , ; .
<li> 
<li> 
<li> 
<li> 
<li> 
<li> 
<li> 
<li> 

  ; .
 

  ; .
 

 
 The following is on one film (Digital Genealogical Society Film No. 8285471):
           Vol. 1.1898: FHC No. ;  (images 12–192).
      Vol. 9.1909–1910: FHC No. ;  (images 206–318).
      Vol. 10. 1912: FHC No. ;  (images 332–511).

 The following is on one film (DGS Film No. 8285469):
           Vol. 2.1899: FHC No. 
      Vol. 4.1901: FHC No. 
      Vol. 6.1904: FHC No. 

 The following is on one film (DGS Film No. 8285470):
           Vol. 7.1906–1907: FHC No. 
      Vol. 8.1908–1909: FHC No. 

 The following is on one film (DGS Film No. 8285472):
           Vol. 1.1898: FHC No. 
      Vol. 9.1909–1910: FHC No. 
      Vol. 10. 1912: FHC No. 

 
 Vol. 10. 1912: 

  ; ;  (ProQuest eBook).

  ; ; .
 

  ;  & .The publishers, William Edwin Baker (1830–1909) and his brother, Abishai Alden Baker (1835–1933) – both Hartford-based insurance agents who also published and sold maps – were descendants of Elizabeth Alden, a well-known pilgrim.
 
 

 
Citations from the article:
 
 
 
  

 
 

 
 
 
 
 
  ; .
  
 
 
 
  
  
  
  
 

 
 
 
 
 

  .

  ; .

  .
 
 
 
 
 .
  (alternative access → )
  (alternative access → )
  Alternative access →.
  Alternative access →  ;  (online);  (print ed.) (US Newsstream database).
   (print ed.);  (online ed.) (US Newsstream database);   (print ed.) (US Newsstream database).

  ; .
 
Bragg, a Boston Municipal Court Judge in the Charleston District, expounds on the woes of the former Town of Charleston after Boston annexed it.

  ; .
 
 

 
 

 

 

 

  , .
 Addresses:
 
 
 
 
 Letters:
 
 

 

History of New York City
Directories
Publications established in 1786
18th century in New York (state)
19th century in New York City
20th century in New York City
Books about New York City
History of Queens, New York
Queens, New York-related lists
Genealogy publications
City directories